On June 8 of 1692, in Mexico City, between 4 and 11 at night, a riot took place. The city was celebrating the traditional festival of Corpus Christi. At this time, there was a collective tension due to the shortage of staple foods like maize and wheat. This tension was directly related to the discontent of the inhabitants because the authorities in charge of the supply were speculating with the grain reserve stored in the granary and in the alhóndiga. 

Life had become difficult for the indigenous, mestizos, mulattos, and poor Spaniards. In the previous year, maize and wheat crops had failed due to flooding. That day a fairly large group of indigenous people, approximately 10,000, rebelled against the urban authorities, joined by some mestizos, mulattos and poor Spaniards. The crowd destroyed a number of government buildings such as the Palace of the Viceroys and the City Hall, burned administrative archives and set fire to the merchants' drawers located in the main square.

This event made a strong impression on the society of the capital of the New Spain  as it was the first social rebellion since the beginning of the viceregal period. This was widely reported by Carlos de Sigüenza y Góngora, the journalist Antonio de Robles and the then chronicler of the Third Order of Saint Dominic, Thomas de la Fuente Salazar.

One of the wings of the Palace of the Viceroys is seen destroyed after the fire caused during the riot in Cristóbal de Villalpando the painting commissioned by the Viceroy Count of Galve.

References

Bibliography 
 

Riots and civil disorder in Mexico
History of Mexico City